Alabama Theatre may refer to:
Alabama Theatre, the oldest and listed on the National Register of Historic Places in Birmingham, Alabama
Alabama Theatre (Houston), located in Houston, Texas
Alabama Theatre (Myrtle Beach), located in Myrtle Beach, South Carolina